Charaxes dubiosus is a butterfly in the family Nymphalidae. It is found in Cameroon. It is a species of doubtful status.

References

Butterflies described in 1936
dubiosus
Endemic fauna of Cameroon
Butterflies of Africa